Friday After Next (Original Soundtrack) is the soundtrack album to Marcus Raboy's 2002 Christmas-themed comedy film Friday After Next. It was released on November 19, 2002 via Hollywood Records. Produced by Mitch Rotter, Mitchell Leib and Spring Aspers with Ice Cube and Matt Alvarez as executive producers, the album is composed of hip hop, contemporary R&B and christmas music.

The soundtrack features contributions from Calvin Richardson, Flipmode Squad, F.T., G-Unit, K-Mont, Kokane, Krayzie Bone, LaReece, Nappy Roots, Roscoe, Tha Eastsidaz, Westside Connection, Whateva, Donny Hathaway, Eartha Kitt, Leon Haywood, Slave, The Temptations.

It peaked at number 115 on the Billboard 200, number 23 on the Top R&B/Hip-Hop Albums chart and number 8 on the Top Soundtracks chart in the United States.

Track listing

Charts

References

External links

Christmas music
Hip hop soundtracks
2002 soundtrack albums
Comedy film soundtracks
Friday (franchise) music
Albums produced by Fredwreck
Contemporary R&B soundtracks
Albums produced by Rockwilder
Hollywood Records soundtracks
Albums produced by Sha Money XL
Albums produced by Dallas Austin